Monocentrum is a genus of beetles in the family Carabidae, containing the following species:

 Monocentrum convexum (Sloane, 1905)
 Monocentrum frenchi (Sloane, 1905)
 Monocentrum grandiceps Chaudoir, 1868
 Monocentrum laticeps (Sloane, 1897)
 Monocentrum longiceps Chaudoir, 1868
 Monocentrum macros (H. W. Bates, 1874)
 Monocentrum megacephalum (Hope, 1842)
 Monocentrum parallelum (Sloane, 1923)
 Monocentrum perlongum (Sloane, 1897)
 Monocentrum procerum (Sloane, 1916)
 Monocentrum robustum (Sloane, 1916)

References

Scaritinae